Charlie "Tracker" Forbes (8 May 1865 – 20 June 1922) was an Australian rules footballer who played for the Essendon Football Club in the Victorian Football League (VFL).

Family
The son of James Forbes (1815-1900), and Jessie Forbes (1830-1914), née Walker, Charles Forbes was born at West Melbourne, Victoria on 8 May 1865.

Football
Forbes was a high marking ruckman — "being strong and wiry with a long reach he was able to take the ball well above the head of the average size footballer" — who, with his Essendon team-mates, ruckman Fred Ball and rover Colin Campbell, formed the dominant ruck combination of the era.

Essendon (VFA)
Recruited from the North Park "junior team" in West Melbourne, Forbes played 140 games between 1889 and 1896 for Essendon in the VFA, prior to the VFL's foundation.

A member of the Essendon teams that won four successive premierships from 1891 and 1894, Forbes was named Player of the Season in 1892 by The Argus.

Essendon (VFL)
In 1897, already 32, and playing as a "follower", he was one of the 20 who played for Essendon in its first VFL match against Geelong, at Corio Oval, on 8 May 1897:  Jim Anderson, Edward "Son" Barry, Arthur Cleghorn, Tod Collins, Jim Darcy, Charlie Forbes, Johnny Graham, Joe Groves, George Hastings, Ted Kinnear, George Martin, Bob McCormick, Pat O'Loughlin, Gus Officer, Ned Officer, Bert Salkeld, George Stuckey, George Vautin, Norman Waugh, and Harry Wright.

He played in Essendon's VFL premiership team in 1897 (there was no "Grand Final" that year). He also played in the first-ever VFL "Grand Final" in 1898, which Essendon lost to Fitzroy.

Death
Forbes died at his residence in West Melbourne, Victoria, following a protracted period of illness, on 20 June 1922.

See also
 The Footballers' Alphabet

Notes

References
 'Follower', "The Footballers' Alphabet", The Leader, (Saturday, 23 July 1898), p.17.
 Maplestone, M., Flying Higher: History of the Essendon Football Club 1872–1996, Essendon Football Club, (Melbourne), 1996.

External links

 
 
 Essendon Football Club profile
 Charlie Forbes, at Boyles Football Photos''.
 Charles "Tracker" Forbes, at Find a Grave.

1865 births
1922 deaths
Australian rules footballers from Melbourne
Essendon Football Club (VFA) players
Essendon Football Club players
Essendon Football Club Premiership players
One-time VFL/AFL Premiership players
People from West Melbourne, Victoria